Gold Watch: 20 Golden Greats is the sixth compilation album by Australian rock band Hoodoo Gurus, released in 2012. The album peaked at number 15 on the ARIA Charts.

Reception 

Mark Deming from AllMusic gave the album 4 out of 5 saying "They were never Australia's biggest rock band or the best, but there are few (if any) bands from the Antipodes who were more consistently, purely enjoyable than the Hoodoo Gurus. Capable of playing revved-up garage rock, sparkling uptempo pop, muscular hard rock, and various combinations thereof, the Hoodoo Gurus could do it all with an engaging sense of humor that never turned their songs into jokes, and with the energy, enthusiasm, swagger, and chops to make their songs come alive and stomp about all night long. The Hoodoos made more than a few brilliant albums in their day, but anyone who doubts their genius as a singles act is advised to avail themselves of Gold Watch: 20 Golden Greats, which compiles the bulk of the band's 7" A-sides and delivers one instant classic after another for 73 minutes. While the majority of the band's fans consider the 1984-1989 stretch to be the band's glory days, give a spin to the latter-day cuts included here and you'll discover that 'Waking Up Tired', ,Miss Freelove '69, and ",I Hope You're Happy, are just as fine on their own terms, and the new number included here, 'Use-By Date' confirms this band isn't out of gas just yet. The Hoodoo Gurus have made enough great music that a box set is in order by now, but if you want a single-disc summation of this band's dedication to all that is cool and joyous in rock & roll, then Gold Watch delivers the goods in style."

Track listing

Charts

References

Hoodoo Gurus albums
2012 compilation albums
Sony Music compilation albums
Compilation albums by Australian artists